Comb Wash is a long narrow valley in south central San Juan County, Utah, United States. (Although the Comb Wash ends at the San Juan River, the Comb Ridge continues south for about another  into northern Arizona.)

On the western edge of Comb Wash is a series of canyons draining Cedar Mesa. To the north is Arch Canyon, which has Texas Canyon as an upper tributary. In the central section are Mule Canyon, Dry Wash, and the combined outlet of Fish and Owl canyons. To the south are McCloyd's Canyon (containing the Moon House ruin) and Road Canyon.  Scattered throughout these canyons are cliff dwellings of the Ancestral Puebloans.

SR-95 crosses the northern part of Comb Wash, while U.S. Route 163 crosses further south. Running along the wash is a primitive road, often impassable after floods. Nearby are the Natural Bridges National Monument, the Grand Gulch Primitive Area, the Valley of the Gods scenic area, and Goosenecks State Park.

See also
 Posey War
 List of rivers of Utah
 List of valleys of Utah

References

External links

 Geology of Comb Wash
 Comb Wash (on visitingtheancients.com)
 
 

Rivers of San Juan County, Utah
Colorado Plateau
Valleys of Utah
Rivers of Utah